= Fore Georgia =

FORE Georgia is a golf magazine which was started in September 1998 by John Barrett of Golf Media, Inc. The magazine is published ten times per year. It is printed on high gloss enamel stock and is tabloid in size. It is distributed in quantity to all courses, driving ranges and teaching centers and golf retailers that employ GAPGA Professionals.

== Content ==
The editorial content of the publication is dedicated to golf enthusiasts in the entire state of Georgia. It covers golf and golf business news related to amateur golf (senior, men, women and junior), plus highlights of the GAPGA and the Professional Tours when they are played in Georgia. It includes features such as "Georgian on Tour", "Faces on the Tee", and "GolfTalk". In each issue readers will also find articles covering the latest golf technology, profiles on some of the state's top courses, tournament calendars and results, and the Peach State Leaderboard, for those who enjoy tracking the success of their favorite golfers on Tour.
